Speed Devils is a 1935 American film directed by Joseph Henabery, coproduced by Perfect Circle Piston Company and Warner Brothers, and released by Warner Brothers. The film is also known as Thru Traffic.

Cast 
Paul Kelly as Martin Gray
Marguerite Churchill as Pat Corey
Russell Hardie as Dan Holden
Leo Curley
Walter Fenner
Earl Mitchell

External links 

1935 films
1935 drama films
American auto racing films
American drama films
American black-and-white films
1930s English-language films
1930s American films